Thomas Bermingham (1940 – 30 September 2020) was an Irish Gaelic footballer. He played with club sides Fermoy, Grange, Bantry Blues and Crosshaven, divisional sides Avondhu and Carbery and at inter-county level with Waterford and Cork.

Playing career

Bermingham first played Gaelic football at club level with Kill before transferring to the Fermoy club in 1959. He later joined the Grange club and won two North Cork JAFC titles. Bermingham also earned inclusion on the Avondhu divisional team that won the Cork SFC title in 1961. He subsequently transferred to the Bantry Blues club with whom he won consecutive West Cork JAFC titles. Bermingham won a second Cork SFC title as a member of the Carbery divisional team in 1968. He ended his club career with Crosshaven.

Bermingham's inter-county career began at minor level with Waterford, before later lining out at junior and senior levels. He later declared for Cork and was an unused substitute for the 1962 Munster SFC. Bermingham's inter-county career was subsequently interrupted when, as a welder with Verolme, he was seconded to work on the ship building industry in Holland. He returned to the inter-county scene with the Cork junior team in 1966 before re-joining the senior team the following year. Bermingham was an unused substitute when Cork were beaten by Meath in the 1967 All-Ireland final.

Death

Bermingham died on 30 September 2020, aged 80.

Honours

Grange
North Cork Junior A Football Championship: 1964, 1966

Bantry Blues
West Cork Junior A Football Championship: 1968, 1969

Avondhu
Cork Senior Football Championship: 1961

Carbery
Cork Senior Football Championship: 1968

Cork
Munster Senior Football Championship: 1967
Munster Junior Football Championship: 1966

References

1940 births
2020 deaths
Fermoy Gaelic footballers
Bantry Blues Gaelic footballers
Avondhu Gaelic footballers
Carbery Gaelic footballers
Cork inter-county Gaelic footballers
Waterford inter-county Gaelic footballers
Welders